The Guyana Defence Force (GDF) is the military of Guyana, established in 1965. It has military bases across the nation.  The Commander-in-Chief of the Defence Force is always the incumbent President of Guyana.

History
The GDF was formed on 1 November 1965.  Members of the new Defence Force were drawn from the British Guiana Volunteer Force (BGVF), Special Service Unit (SSU), British Guiana Police Force (BGPF) and civilians. Training assistance was provided by British instructors.

In January 1969, the GDF faced their first test when the Rupununi Uprising, a bloody separatist movement in southern Guyana, attempted to annex the territory to Venezuela that was contained 3 days later with a balance of between 70 and 100 dead.

In August 1969 the GDF launch a surprise attack code name Operation Climax to remove Suriname military personnel from the New River Triangle. The operation was executed with maximum precision and the Suriname ultimate decision was a hasty withdrawal. To date, this operation remains one of the most successful ventures of the Force.

The GDF is an integral part of the Guyanese nation. Resources and equipment of the GDF are used to help other Guyanese; examples include medical mercy flights and the construction of roads and airstrips by the Engineering Corps.

Enlistment into the force is voluntary for officers and soldiers. Basic training is done within GDF training schools, which has also trained officers and soldiers from Commonwealth Caribbean territories. However, officers are trained at one of two British officer training schools: Royal Military Academy Sandhurst (Infantry Training) and Britannia Royal Naval College (Coast Guard Training).

The training and skills gained by the members of the GDF have been used when they move either into civilian life or into the sister military organizations, the Guyana National Reserve (now the Second Infantry Battalion Group Reserve, which numbers around 3,000 reservists) and formerly the Guyana National Service (disbanded in 2000) and the Guyana People's Militia.

Role of the GDF
 Defend the territorial integrity of Guyana.
 Assist the civil power in the maintenance of law and order when required to do so.
 Contribute to the economic development of Guyana.

Organization

 1st Infantry Battalion Group
 3rd Infantry Battalion
 2nd Infantry Battalion Group Reserve (formerly the Guyana People's Militia)
 31 Special Forces Squadron
 21st Artillery Company
 Engineer Battalion
 Signals Corps
 Defence Headquarters
 Training Corps
 Intelligence Corps
 Coast Guard
 Band Corps
 Medical Corps
 Air Corps

1st Infantry Battalion Group
In the 1980s, Guyana National Service provided infantry battalions for use by the GDF for the purposes of national security. Those battalions were amalgamated in 1988 to form what is now the 1st Infantry Battalion Group. The now combined battalion is today required to carry out the tasks protecting the country in case of wartime and to help the local authorities in emergency situations.

GDF Band Corps
The Guyana Defence Force Band Corps is the official musical unit of the GDF whose role is to provide musical accompaniment for ceremonial functions of the GDF. The members were drawn from the Rifle Companies and the defunct Volunteer Force and were brought out during regimental military parades. The Guyana Defence Force Steel Band would soon follow the main band's lead after its own establishment in 1970, three years after the original band was founded.

Medical Corps
The Medical Corps provides medical and dental care to all the members of the GDF and their immediate families. It often liaises with the Health ministry for medical procedures and protocol to be carried out effectively. The corps is situated in Base Camp Ayanganna which includes facilities such as a medical laboratory and a dental lab.

Chief of Staff

Army equipment

Infantry weapons
 Walther PPK hand gun 
 M16A2 rifle 
 Type 56 rifle 
 Type 63 rifle 
 AKM rifle 
 AK 47 rifle 
 G3 
 PK MG 
 FN MAG MG 
 RPG-7 anti tank rocket propelled grenade launcher 
 M964 FAL 7.62×51mm battle rifle (being replaced by Imbel A2) 
 IMBEL MD97 5.56×45mm assault rifle (being replaced by Imbel A2) 
 FN MAG M971 7.62×51mm Medium machine gun

Army transport vehicles
8 Mfezi (ambulance) 
13 Praga V3S 
24 Mercedes-Benz NG 
50 GAZ Sadko 
100 Toyota Type 73 Medium Truck 
24  Tatra 815-7

Armoured vehicles
54 Ford F-350 pickup 
5 Shorland APC  and 
18 EE-9 Cascavel armoured car 
24 EE-11 Urutu APC 
42 VEC-M1 cavalry scout vehicle

Artillery and mortars
12 D-30 122mm towed howitzer 
30 M-46 130mm towed howitzer 
12 L16 81mm mortar 
24 M-43 82mm mortar 
18 M1938 mortar 120mm 
9 Type 65 82mm recoilless rifle 
20 Type 63 multiple rocket launcher 
29 ZPU 4x 14.5 mm anti-aircraft gun  and 
24 launchers of 100 missiles SA-7 Grail MANPAD 
19 OTO Melara Mod 56 105 mm towed howitzer

Aircraft inventory

The Defence force air wing was formed in 1968 and was then renamed the Guyana Defence force air command in 1973. Seven Britten-Norman BN-2A Islander were delivered over a five-year period in the 1970s and then were supplemented by Short Skyvans series 3Ms in 1979. In 1986 3 Mil Mi-8 were delivered. The GDF currently operates 24 fixed-wing aircraft and 24 helicopters. 2 Do-228 aircraft for Guyana Defence Force (GDF) – Air Corps was ordered from Hindustan Aeronautics Limited

Current inventory

Retired aircraft
Previous notable aircraft operated by the Air Wing were the Beechcraft Super King Air, Cessna 182, Cessna 206, Embraer EMB 110, Helio Courier, Aérospatiale Alouette III, Bell 212, and the Mil Mi-8.

Coast Guard

The Guyana Defence Force Coast Guard is the naval component of the Guyana Defence Force.
1 150 DEFIANT metal shark boat on order

1 River-class minesweeper — Acquired from the United Kingdom around August 2001. GDFS Essequibo is ex-Royal Navy Orwell (M2011). The ship is considered in unserviceable condition, .
4 T-44 patrol boats — Ex-United States Coast Guard motor lifeboats acquired from the United States around June 2001. 18 tons full load.
7 Metal Shark Boats patrol boats — 5 28-foot, and 2 38-foot. The first 3 of the aluminum-hulled 28-foot boats were donated by the United States in March 2014. In March 2017, 2 of the 38-foot boats were acquired.
1 Metal Shark Boats offshore patrol vessel — 1 on order, scheduled for delivery in 2022.

References

External links

 

Military units and formations established in 1965